Fred Amata is a Nigerian actor, producer and director. A graduate of Theatre Arts from the University of Jos, Fred shot into limelight in 1986 for his role in a film titled Legacy. He currently serves as the President of the Directors Guild of Nigeria, since 27 February 2016.

Partial filmography

Legacy (1996)
Mortal Inheritance (1996)
Light & Darkness (2001)
My Love (2002)
Keeping Faith: Is That Love? (2002)
Black Mamba (2002)
The Return (2003)
Hand of God (2003) - Nnamdi
Dangerous Desire (2003)
The London Boy (2004)
A Kiss From Rose (2004)
Fated (2005) - Jude (Nigerian Version)
Wheel of Change (2005)
Hidden Treasures (2005)
Emotional Hazard (2005) - Chidi
Anini (2005) - Baba Kingsley
She: You Must Obey (2006)
She2: You Must Obey (2006)
She3: You Must Obey (2006)
Family Affair (2006)
The Amazing Grace (2006) - Etim
The Empire (2006) - Tony Odogwu
Letters to a Stranger (2007) - Fredrick Okoh
Dear God (2007)
Blindfold (2008)
Freedom in Chain (2009)
Black Gold (2011) - Gideon White
Black November (2012) - Gideon White
Road to Redemption (2016) - Aminu
Stormy Hearts (2017) - Mr. Bako
The Sessions (2020 film) (2020) - Mr. Oghenekaro
Rattlesnake: The Ahanna Story (2020) - Senator Obasi
 A Place Called Forward (2022)

Awards and nominations

See also
 List of Nigerian film producers

References

External links

Living people
20th-century Nigerian male actors
21st-century Nigerian male actors
Nigerian film directors
Nigerian film producers
University of Jos alumni
Year of birth missing (living people)
Nigerian male television actors
Nigerian male film actors